The State Register of Heritage Places is maintained by the Heritage Council of Western Australia. , 60 places are heritage-listed in the Shire of Dardanup, of which four are on the State Register of Heritage Places.

List
The Western Australian State Register of Heritage Places, lists the following four state registered places within the Shire of Dardanup:

References

Dardanup
Dardanup